Juan Ignacio Muntañola Vilamala is a Spanish former professional tennis player.

A right-handed player, Muntañola competed on the professional tour in the 1970s.

Muntañola, who reached a best ranking of 101 in the world, made his grand slam main draw debut at the 1974 Wimbledon Championships, as a lucky loser from qualifying. He played in three editions of the French Open, including in 1975 when he won through to the second round, where he was beaten by eventual finalist Guillermo Vilas.

Grand Prix career finals

Singles: 1 (0–1)

Notes

References

External links
 
 

Year of birth missing (living people)
Living people
Spanish male tennis players